Adscita capitalis is a moth of the family Zygaenidae. It is found in North Macedonia, Greece (including Samos) and Turkey.

The length of the forewings is 9.5–11.4 mm for males and 9.4–10.5 mm for females. Adults are on wing from June to July.

The larvae mainly feed on Helianthemum canum, but have also been recorded feeding on Helianthemum grandifloris, Helianthemum georgicum and Helianthemum nummularium. The first three instars mine the leaves of their host plant. The mine has the form of a gallery on H. georgicum, while they only feed on the parenchyma of the leaves when feeding on H. nummularium.

References

C. M. Naumann, W. G. Tremewan: The Western Palaearctic Zygaenidae. Apollo Books, Stenstrup 1999,

External links

The Barcode of Life Data Systems (BOLD)

Procridinae
Moths described in 1879
Moths of Europe
Moths of Asia